Moor Road railway station is on the Middleton Railway in West Yorkshire, England.

History 
The station is the principal station on the railway. It is situated on Moor Road. The station was constructed at a new position in 2006 as a replacement for an earlier station built close by. The station adjoins the headquarters of the railway which contains an Engine House Museum, shop, toilets, workshop and conference room.

Information 
Moor Road is located next to the Tulip Retail Park. The site consists of:
 A station platform with a wooden shelter and a coal stage.

References

External links 
Official website

Heritage railway stations in Leeds
Railway stations built for UK heritage railways